The Western Aramaic languages represent a specific group of Aramaic languages once spoken widely throughout the ancient Levant, from ancient Nabatea and Judea, across Palestine and Samaria, further to Palmyra and Phoenicia, and into Syria proper. The group was divided into several regional variants, spoken mainly by the Arameans and ancient People of the Levant, such as the people of Palestine before Islam. All of the Western Aramaic languages are today considered extinct, except Western Neo-Aramaic.

Western Aramaic languages were distinct from Eastern Aramaic languages, spoken in various eastern regions, throughout modern northeastern Syria, southeastern Turkey, northern Iraq, and northwestern Iran.

History

In the middle of the fifth century, Theodoret of Cyrus (d.  466) noted Aramaic, commonly labeled by Greeks as "Syrian" or "Syriac", was widely spoken, and also stated that "the Osroënians, the Syrians, the people of the Euphrates, the Palestinians, and the Phoenicians all speak Syriac, but with many differences in pronunciation". Theodoret′s regional differentiation of Aramaic dialects included an explicit distinction between "Syrians" (speakers from Syria proper west of the Euphrates), "Phoenicians" (speakers from ancient Phoenicia), and "Palestinians" (speakers of Palestine), thus recording the regional diversity of Western Aramaic dialects (in Syria proper, Phoenicia and Palestine) during the late antiquity.

Following the early Muslim conquests in the seventh century, and consequent cultural and linguistic Arabization of the Levant, Arabic gradually replaced the Aramaic, including the Western Aramaic varieties, as the first language of most people.

Despite this, Western Aramaic appears to have survived for a relatively long time, at least in some villages in mountainous areas of the Mount Lebanon range and the Anti-Lebanon Mountains (now in Syria). In fact, up until the 17th century, travelers in the Lebanon region still reported Aramaic-speaking villages.

Present

Today, Western Neo-Aramaic is the sole surviving remnant of the entire western branch of the Aramaic languages, spoken by no more than a few thousand people in the Anti-Lebanon Mountains of Syria, mainly in Maaloula, Jubb'adin and Bakhah. Their populations avoided cultural and linguistic Arabization due to the remote, mountainous locations of their isolated villages.

See also

References

Sources

 
 
 
 
 
 
 
 
 
 
 
 
 
 
  
 
 
 
 
 
 
 
 
 
 
 
 
 

 
Aramaic languages